State Route 159 (SR 159) is a  state highway that serves as a north–south connection between Gordo and Fayette through Fayette and Pickens counties. SR 159 intersects US 82 at its southern terminus and SR 171 at its northern terminus.

Route description

SR 159 begins at an intersection with US 82 (internally designated as SR 6) in the central business district of Gordo. From this point, SR 159 follows a meandering northeasterly course through northern Pickens County and southern Fayette County en route to its northern terminus, an intersection with SR 171 in Fayette.

Major intersections

See also

References

159
Transportation in Fayette County, Alabama
Transportation in Pickens County, Alabama